Tajik–Turkish relations are friendly and cooperative and underlined with a legal basis of more than 30 treaties and protocols which have been signed between two countries since 1991.

Country comparison

Modern relations
Turkey recognized the independence of Tajikistan on 16 December 1991 and established diplomatic relations on 29 January 1992. The Turkish Embassy in Dushanbe was opened on 4 August 1992 and the Tajik Embassy in Ankara was opened on 16 October 1995.

Turkey's relations with Tajikistan are considered within the framework of relations with other Central Asian republics but developed more slowly due to Tajikistan's internal war between 1992 and 1997. During this period the Turkish embassy in Dushanbe was the only diplomatic mission which remained open and the visit of Turkish Prime Minister Suleyman Demirel was the only high level visit to Tajikistan.

Tajik President Emomali Rahmon made a 19–22 January 2006 official visit to Turkey.

Turkish Presidential visit to Dushanbe
Turkish President Abdullah Gül made a 29 June 2009 official visit to Dushanbe where he met with Tajik President Rahmon to discuss bilateral relations, with Gül reiterating the two countries common stance on “terrorism, extremist movements, illegal immigration, drug and arms smuggling, organised crime and the proliferation of weapons of mass destruction,” before concentrating on Afghanistan (as he had done in his preceding visit to Kyrgyzstan) by stating, “Afghanistan’s stability and peace is very important for Central Asia and the rest of the world. Tajikistan, which shares a land border of 1,400 kilometres with Afghanistan, has always played a constructive role in this regard.”

Group 24
The founder of the Tajik Group 24 opposition movement, Umarali Quvatov, was assassinated in Turkey in March 2015. Turkey detained two members of Group 24, Suhrobi Zafar and Nasim Sharipov, but did not extradite them due to the Constitutional Court of Turkey ruling that they may face torture in Tajikistan.

See also
 Foreign relations of Tajikistan
 Foreign relations of Turkey

References

 
Turkey
Bilateral relations of Turkey